Hanna Lindblad (born 13 October 1980 in Motala) is a Swedish singer.  After studying music at Hammar High School in Sandviken, Lindblad went to Balettakademien in Gothenburg, from which she graduated in 2000.

She was nominated for a Guldmasken for her role in "Saturday Night Fever". She participated in the second Semi-Final of Melodifestivalen 2010 in Sandviken where she achieved fifth place with her song Manipulated. She participated in the fourth Semi-Final of Melodifestivalen 2012 with the song "Goosebumps".

Stage productions
A Hollywood Tribute SHOWBUSINESS at Grand Hôtel and Oscarsteatern
Saturday Night Fever
Singin' in the Rain at Oscarsteatern
A Chorus Line
Sound of Music
Skönheten och Odjuret
Flash Dance at Chinateatern

Television shows
Sing a long (2007)
Så ska det låta (2007)
Doobidoo (2008)
Doobidoo (2009)
Melodifestivalen 2010
Melodifestivalen 2012

Other
Rhapsody in Rock (2007)

References

1980 births
Swedish female dancers
Living people
Balettakademien
21st-century Swedish singers
21st-century Swedish women singers
Melodifestivalen contestants of 2012
Melodifestivalen contestants of 2010